Sar Chah-e Duruznab (also Romanized as Sar Chāh-e Dūrūznāb; also known as Sar Chāh) is a village in Qilab Rural District, Alvar-e Garmsiri District, Andimeshk County, Khuzestan Province, Iran. At the 2006 census, its population was 116, in 23 families.

References 

Populated places in Andimeshk County